Trapeliopsis is a genus of lichenized fungi in the family Trapeliaceae. It contains 20 species. The genus was circumscribed in 1980 by Hannes Hertel and Gotthard Schneider, with Trapeliopsis wallrothii designated as the type species.

Species
Trapeliopsis aeneofusca 
Trapeliopsis bisorediata  – North America
Trapeliopsis californica  – North America
Trapeliopsis colensoi 
Trapeliopsis congregans 
Trapeliopsis flexuosa 
Trapeliopsis gelatinosa 
Trapeliopsis glaucolepidea 
Trapeliopsis glaucopholis 
Trapeliopsis granulosa 
Trapeliopsis gymnidiata  – Macaronesia
Trapeliopsis gyrocarpa  – Australia
Trapeliopsis percrenata 
Trapeliopsis pseudogranulosa  – Europe
Trapeliopsis steppica  – North America
Trapeliopsis studerae  – Brazil
Trapeliopsis thermophila  – Australia
Trapeliopsis viridescens 
Trapeliopsis wallrothii

References

Baeomycetales
Lichen genera
Baeomycetales genera
Taxa described in 1980
Taxa named by Hannes Hertel